Eoentelodon is a small, primitive entelodont, assigned as such by Carroll (1998), from the Middle Eocene of China.  It was a very small entelodont, about the size of a modern pig, and was slightly smaller than its North American counterpart, Brachyhyops.

Eoentelodon was synonymized subjectively with Brachyhyops by Lucas and Emry (2004). However, in 2007, I. Vislobokova determined that Eoentelodon was not only distinct from Brachyhyops, but more closely related to Proentelodon, another primitive entelodont found in slightly older Middle Eocene strata of Mongolia.

References

Entelodonts
Eocene even-toed ungulates
Fossils of China
Fossil taxa described in 1988
Prehistoric even-toed ungulate genera